Bujjigadu is a 2008 Indian Telugu-language action film directed by Puri Jagannadh and produced by K. S. Rama Rao. The film stars Prabhas, Trisha while Mohan Babu, Sanjjanaa,   and Kota Srinivasa Rao play supporting roles. The film was later remade in Bangladesh as  Pagla Deewana  with Pori Moni & Shahriaz.

Plot
Bujji and Chitti are inseparable childhood friends and like each other. One day, they argue and Chitti tells Bujji to leave and never return. When he pleads to her, she asks him to prove his sincerity by staying away from her for twelve years and promises to marry him if he does. Though devastated, Bujji reluctantly agrees to stay away from her and moves to Chennai to keep a distance. Meanwhile, Chitti's family moves to Hyderabad, cutting all ties from Bujji's family.

Bujji grows up in Chennai and becomes a hooligan, though he preserves his soft nature and his love for Chitti. After twelve years, he returns to meet Chitti but is caught in a brawl and is jailed. There, he meets the sons of Machi Reddy, and they offer him one crore to kill Sivanna. Bujji thinks that he could save money for his married life and agrees, but when Bujji tries to kill Sivanna, he is injured. Sivanna is impressed by his innocence and purity and asks him to stay with him for a while. He stays there under the name of Rajinikanth, Bujji's favorite actor.

Later, Bujji meets Sivanna's sister Meghana, whose real name is Chitti. However, Bujji is unable to recognize her as Chitti. Bujji eventually realises that Meghana was Chitti and tries to reveal that to her, but Sivanna stops him, saying that Meghana would only stay with him until she finds Bujji, as she actually hates her brother since he was responsible for his first wife's death. When Machi Reddy learns that he is part of Sivanna's gang, his sons shoot Chitti, kidnap Sivanna's second sister Kangana, and ask to trade her for Sivanna. Chitti sends Bujji to save Sivanna. Bujji and Sivanna manage to thrash Machi Reddy and his goons. Sivanna is injured but survives. After recovery, he asks Bujji and Chitti what the fight they had in their childhood was about. Bujji states that one time on the beach, Chitti had built a sand temple with a stone as a representation for her God, but Bujji had destroyed it and it made her angry. The film ends with Chitti reuniting with Bujji and living with Sivanna.

Cast

 Prabhas as Bujji a.k.a. Lingaraju
Akash Puri as young Bujji
 Trisha as  Meghana aka Chitti
 Mohan Babu as Sivanna
 Sanjjanaa Galrani as Kangana
 Kota Srinivasa Rao as Machi Reddy
 Sunil as Sathi / Tokyo Jaani
 Ali as Sarparaju Kaatre / Bokadia
 Satyam Rajesh as Bujji's friend
 M. S. Narayana as Prabhas Raju; Bujji's father
 Hema as Bujji's stepmother
 Ahuti Prasad as Real Estate Venkat Rao, Kangana's father
 Sudha as Kangana's mother
 Subbaraju as Venkat
 Adarsh Balakrishna
 Ajay as Machi Reddy's son
 Supreeth as Machi Reddy's son
 Brahmaji as Brahmaji, Sivanna's henchman
 Khayyum as Sivanna's henchman
 Prabhas Sreenu as Sivanna's henchman
 Brahmanandam
 Jeeva as Police Officer
 Raja Ravindra as Advocate Ravi
 Ponnambalam
 Gautam Raju
 Besant Ravi
 Mumaith Khan as Chittu from Chilakaluru in a special appearance in the song "Chitti Aayire"

Release
The film was released worldwide with 750 prints. It Was Dubbed In Malayalam As Rudran And In Tamil As Kumaran Rajini Rasigan. It Was Dubbed In Hindi As Deewar: Man Of Power And It Was Dubbed In Bhojpuri As Yeh Deewar.

Music

The soundtrack for the film was composed by Sandeep Chowta and released on 18 April 2008 by Aditya Music.

Reception 
A critic from Rediff.com wrote that "Bujjigadu may perhaps provide Prabhas the much needed hit but it offers nothing drastically new".

References

External links

2008 films
2008 action films
2000s Telugu-language films
Indian action films
Films shot in Tamil Nadu
Telugu films remade in other languages
Films directed by Puri Jagannadh
Films scored by Sandeep Chowta